Florence D. Allan (born 26 May 1998) is a Cayman Islands competitive sailor.

She competed at the 2016 Summer Olympics in Rio de Janeiro, in the women's Laser Radial, where she finished in 36th place. Allan was the first Olympic sailor to compete for the Cayman Islands in 16 years.

References

External links

1998 births
Living people
Caymanian sportswomen
Caymanian female sailors (sport)
Olympic sailors of the Cayman Islands
Sailors at the 2016 Summer Olympics – Laser Radial